The 2002–03 Northern Football League season was the 105th in the history of Northern Football League, a football competition in England.

Division One

Division One featured 18 clubs which competed in the division last season, along with three new clubs, promoted from Division Two:
 Esh Winning
 Prudhoe Town
 Shildon

Also, Washington Ikeda Hoover changed name to Washington.

League table

Division Two

Division Two featured 17 clubs which competed in the division last season, along with four new clubs, relegated from Division One:
 Ashington
 Seaham Red Star
 Thornaby

League table

References

External links
 Northern Football League official site

Northern Football League seasons
2002–03 in English football leagues